Bertha Trost was a socialite and beauty specialist of German birth, resident in Britain, who was forced out of the United Kingdom for being a suspected German spy.

Early life

Around 1885 she was married in Germany and had at least one son. In 1895, Bertha Trost moved from Potsdam to London. The Seattle Star claimed that she was forced to move to London after a scandal in the Imperial Austro-Hungarian court in Vienna.

London life

She lived 30 years in London setting up two shops - a beauty salon and an antiquarian shop. She was famous for dressing up in Victorian garb and was regularly seen in Hyde Park. At her beauty shop she would allow clients to run up huge debts and then get the clients to provide information to pay off these debts.

Exile

In 1915 she used her network to find information about her German son who she had heard been captured by the British during World War I. Scotland Yard became aware of her and after digging into her past found her German roots. Although she had lived in London for thirty years she had never naturalized and Scotland Yard used her status as a foreigner to force her out of the country. In a last-ditch effort she married an English gentleman but it didn't halt her deportation, her shops and belongings were seized by the British Public Trustee.

See also
 Mata Hari

Bibliography
Notes

References 
 
  - Total pages: 240 
 

Civilians who were court-martialed
Double agents
Female wartime spies
Women in World War I
World War I espionage
World War I spies for Germany
19th-century British businesswomen
20th-century British businesswomen
Beauticians